Cinderella '80 (Italian: Cenerentola '80) is a 1984 Italian romantic comedy film directed by Roberto Malenotti. It was both released as a film (120min length) and as a TV-miniseries (with 206min length).

Cast 

 Bonnie Bianco as Cindy Cardone
 Pierre Cosso as Mizio/Prince Eugenio
 Adolfo Celi as Prince Gherardeschi
 Sylva Koscina as Princess Gherardeschi
 Vittorio Caprioli as Harry Cardone
 Sandra Milo as Marianne
 Kendal Kaldwell as Muriel Cardone
 Edy Angelillo as Carol Cardone 
 Franco Caracciolo as Egisto Gherardeschi

References

External links

1984 films
1984 romantic comedy films
1980s teen comedy films
Films about royalty
Films based on Cinderella
Films set in New York City
Films set in Rome
Italian romantic comedy films
Italian coming-of-age comedy films
1980s teen romance films
Films scored by Guido & Maurizio De Angelis
1980s Italian television miniseries
1980s coming-of-age comedy films
1980s Italian-language films
1980s Italian films